Samuel Seyer (1757–1831) was an English schoolmaster and cleric, known as a historian of Bristol.

Life
He was the son of Samuel Seyer (1719?–1776), master of Bristol grammar school. He matriculated at Corpus Christi College, Oxford, on 25 November 1772, and graduated B.A. in 1776 and M.A. in 1780.

About 1790 Seyer succeeded John Jones at the Royal Fort school, where for ten years Andrew Crosse was among his scholars, who found him narrow-minded and unjust. Other pupils were John Kenyon and William John Broderip.

In 1813 Seyer became perpetual curate of Horfield, and in 1824 rector of Filton, Gloucestershire. He died at Bristol on 25 August 1831.

Works

Following first William Barrett, author of the History and Antiquities of Bristol, whom he knew well, Seyer published in 1812 Charters and Letters Patent granted to the Town and City of Bristol. The Latin is printed under an English translation. Seyer was refused access to the originals in the Bristol council-house, and based his text on a late manuscript in the Bodleian Library (Rawlinson 247); he used a translation published in 1736.

In 1821–3 appeared Seyer's Memoirs, Historical and Topographical, of Bristol and its Neighbourhood, with plates by Edward Blore and others (2 vols.). The work, which brings the narrative down to 1760, incorporated the archives of the Berkeley family and the Bristol calendars. Seyer's collections for a second part, on the topography of Bristol, were preserved in manuscript in the Museum Library, Bristol.

Seyer published also:

 The Principles of Christianity, 1796, 1806.
 The Syntax of Latin Verbs, 1798.
 Observations on the Causes of Clerical Non-residence, and on the Act of Parliament lately passed for its Prevention, 1808.
 Latium Redivivum: a Treatise on the Modern Use of the Latin Language and the Prevalence of the French; to which is added a Specimen, accommodated to Modern Use, 1808.

He translated into English verse the Latin poem of Marco Girolamo Vida on chess.

Notes

Attribution

1757 births
1831 deaths
19th-century English Anglican priests
Clergy from Bristol
English antiquarians
Schoolteachers from Bristol
Writers from Bristol